Anne Honoré Østergaard (born 24 January 1981 in Aalborg) is a Danish politician, who is a member of the Folketing for the Venstre political party. She was elected into parliament at the 2019 Danish general election.

Political career
Østergaard has been a member of the municipal council of Aalborg Municipality since 2014. She was elected into parliament at the 2019 election where she received 4,104 votes.

References

External links 
 Biography on the website of the Danish Parliament (Folketinget)

1981 births
Living people
Politicians from Aalborg
Venstre (Denmark) politicians
21st-century Danish women politicians
Danish municipal councillors
Women members of the Folketing
Members of the Folketing 2019–2022